Pierre Pestieau (born 1943 in Froidchapelle) is a Belgian economist. Since receiving his B.A and M.A degrees in economics from the University of Louvain and then his PhD from Yale University, Pestieau has had over thirty-five years of experience teaching and conducting research in public economics and population economics first at Cornell University and then at the University of Liège.

Since 2008, he has been professor emeritus at the University of Liège.

He is a member of CORE, Louvain-la-Neuve and associate member of PSE, Paris. He is also an IZA and CESIfo Fellow. He was awarded the Francqui Prize in 1989.

He is associate editor of Public Economic Theory and CESifo Economic Studies.

Professor Pestieau's major interests are pension economics, social insurance, inheritance taxation, redistributive policies and tax competition. His articles have been published in leading journals such as Econometrica, the Journal of Economic Theory, Economica, the Journal of Public Economics, the Journal of Population Economics and the Scandinavian Journal of Economics. His 2017 book with Mathieu Lefèbvre, L’Etat providence. Défense et illustration, was published by the Presses Universitaires de France. He has also published at Oxford University Press The Welfare State in the European Union. Earlier books were devoted to the performance of public enterprises, inheritance, social security and the underground economy.

Pestieau has held visiting positions at the University of Cornell, London School of Economics, the University of Toulouse, Montreal, Marseille, Paris (1 and 10), Le Mans and Louvain. He has been a consultant to various national and international agencies, including the International Monetary Fund, the World Bank, the OECD and the European Commission.

Bibliography

Books 
 The Performance of Public Enterprises: Concepts and Measurement. (with M. Marchand and H. Tulkens), North-Holland, Amsterdam, 1984, 296 p.
 Public Enterprise in Western Europe (with H. Parris and P. Saynor), Croom Helm, London, 1986, 197 p.
 L'Économie Informelle, (coed. with V. Ginsburgh), Labor Nathan, Bruxelles, 1987, 188 p.
 L'Économie Souterraine, Pluriel, Hachette, Paris, 1989, 320 p.
 Héritage et Transmissions Intergénérationnelles, (coed. with B. Jurion), De Boeck, Bruxelles, 1994, 286 p.
 Social Security and Retirement (with Robert Fenge), MIT Press, 2005.
 The Welfare State in the European Union: Economic and Social Perspectives, Oxford University Press, 2005.
 Pensions Strategies in Europe and the United States, (edited with R. Fenge and G. de Menil), MIT Press, 2008, 299 p.
 L’Etat-providence en Europe. Performance et dumping social (with Mathieu Lefebvre), Editions du CEPREMAP, Paris, 2012, 80 p.
 L’Etat providence. Défense et illustration, (with M. Lefebvre), PUF, Paris, 2017.
 The Welfare State in Europe, (with Mathieu Lefebvre) Oxford University Press, 2018, 240 p.
  "The public economics of changing longevity" Element, Cambridge University Press, 2022.

References

External links
 Pierre Pestieau (Université de Liège)
 Pierre Pestieau (UCL)

Belgian economists
Walloon people
1943 births
Living people
Cornell University faculty
Academic staff of the University of Liège